Friendswood is an unincorporated community in Guilford Township, Hendricks County, Indiana.

History
Friendswood was a station and shipping point on the railroad. A post office was established at Friendswood in 1868, and remained in operation until it was discontinued in 1909. One source speculates the name may indicate the presence of Friends, or Quakers.

References

Unincorporated communities in Hendricks County, Indiana
Unincorporated communities in Indiana
Indianapolis metropolitan area